This is a list of albums attributed to the anime adaptation The Melancholy of Haruhi Suzumiya based on the Haruhi Suzumiya light novel series. There have been three soundtrack singles released for the anime containing the opening, ending, and insert songs featured in the anime series. Three radio drama CDs were released, along with a single which contained the theme songs to the radio dramas. A drama CD was also produced and the final track on the CD contained an original music track. There are nine additional character song albums sung by the voice actors for not only the five main characters in the series, but four other minor characters were also given mini albums.

Soundtracks

Bōken Desho Desho?

 is the opening theme to the Japanese anime The Melancholy of Haruhi Suzumiya, as well as the movie, The Disappearance of Haruhi Suzumiya. It ranked #10 in CD sales on amazon.co.jp when the single was released.

 Oricon Weekly Rank Peak: #10
 Weeks in Chart: 28 weeks
 Sales: 63,371
 2006 End of Year Chart Rank: #141

Track listing
   – 4:18
 Vocals: Aya Hirano (Haruhi Suzumiya)
 Lyrics: Aki Hata
 Music: Akiko Tomita
 Arrangement: Junpei Fujita
   – 3:47
   – 4:18
   – 3:47

Hare Hare Yukai

 is the ending theme to the Japanese anime series The Melancholy of Haruhi Suzumiya. The song is performed in Japanese by Aya Hirano, Minori Chihara and Yuko Goto, the respective voices of the characters Haruhi Suzumiya, Yuki Nagato and Mikuru Asahina from the series.

Due to massive support from fans of the series, the CD maxi single, which also featured the song Welcome UNKNOWN plus karaoke versions of both tracks, reached #5 on the Oricon singles charts, and was the 18th best selling CD single in Japan on May 10, the day it was released. It was also sold out on many online retailers and was amazon.co.jp's #1 selling CD. Hare Hare Yukai won the Radio Kansai Award in 2006, a subset of the Animation Kobe Theme Song Award.

About dance 
The very popular animated choreography accompanying the song, originally broadcast as part of the closing credits, became an Internet meme which inspired many parodies and fanmade videos on the Internet, many of which were posted on video sharing websites such as YouTube. The choreography was based on several singles by the idol group Berryz Kobo, including "Gag 100kaibun Aishite Kudasai", "Special Generation", and "21ji Made no Cinderella". 
 
At Animelo Summer Live in 2006, Hirano and the other three vocalists appeared as special guests in "Hare Hare Yukai" and performed the choreography for the entire piece. On March 18, 2007, "Haruhi Suzumiya's Gekisou" was held, with Aya Hirano, Minori Chihara, and Yuko Goto performing the full version of the dance, as well as Tomokazu Sugita. ]] (who plays Kyon) and Daisuke Ono (who plays Kazuki Koizumi), and all the voice actors of the "SOS Brigade" gathered together to perform the ending version of the dance.
 
The 7th DVD of The Melancholy of Haruhi Suzumiya, released in January 2007, contains a complete TV-size version of the dance. It conforms to the aforementioned storyboard, but there are some differences.
 
On April 8, 2007, as part of the movement to make this single No. 1 on the Oricon chart, a large number of cosplayers performed this song at pedestrian heaven in Akihabara. A flash mob of dancing was held, and the scene was uploaded to a video site, creating a sensation.
 
At Animelo Summer Live 2017, Aya Hirano, Minori Chihara, and Yuko Goto  appeared as an SOS group for the first time in 11 years and sang "Hare Hare Yukai" with dancing. It's been 10 years since "Suzumiya Haruhi no Gekisou" that "Hare Hare Yukai" was performed by the "SOS Brigade" voice actors.
 
At the Lantis Festival on June 23, 2019, Aya Hirano, Minori Chihara, Yuko Goto, Daisuke Ono, and Tomokazu Sugita all gathered as an SOS group for the first time in 12 years since "Haruhi Suzumiya's Gekiso" and performed "Hare Hare Yukai." ” along with the dance.
 
At the collaboration event between the Melancholy of Haruhi Suzumiya and Bandai Namco's app game "Idolmaster Cinderella Girls Starlight Stage" held from August 13, 2021, a 3D MV was implemented for the cover version of this song.

Impact of dance videos posted by voice actors in 2020 

In 2020, when people were forced to stay at home due to the spread of the novel coronavirus epidemic (2019-), Hirano, who played the role of Haruhi in the anime The Melancholy of Haruhi Suzumiya, Aya gave a lecture on the dance of "Hare Hare Yukai" and uploaded a video of her actually dancing to the video on SNS on April 24. This video was the beginning, and Tomokazu Sugita, who played Kyon in the same anime, and  Minoru Shiraishi as Taniguchi, Kobushinobuyuki, who played the role of the director of the computer research department in the anime, also reacted on Twitter. Words such as "Hare Hare Yukai" and "Tomokazu Sugita / AGRS Channel" became trending on Twitter , and Hirano's dance video recorded over 5 million views as of the night of the 26th. . In addition, Sugita's dance video was posted on YouTube more than 100,000 times  about an hour after it was posted, and more than 1.8 million times 12 hours after it was posted, ranking in at the top of the rapidly rising video.  caused a sensation.

Pianist Riyoko Takagi and  Talent Shoko Nakagawa, entertainer Mumasa Tsukaji (Drunk Dragon), and actresses Ruka Matsuda and Rena Matsui who share the office with Hirano. It also spreads among celebrities, under the influence of a series of events, the music chart "Hot Animation" provided by Billboard JAPAN entered the chart at 6th place in the first week of May 2020.

 Oricon Weekly Rank Peak: #5 (Ties as highest charting release of the Haruhi Suzumiya franchise.)
 Weeks in Chart: 92 weeks
 Sales: 123,000+
 2006 End of Year Chart Rank: #104

Track listing 

   – 3:37
 Vocals: Aya Hirano (Haruhi Suzumiya), Minori Chihara (Yuki Nagato), and Yuko Goto (Mikuru Asahina)
 Lyrics: Aki Hata
 Music: Tomokazu Toshiro
 Arrangement: Takahiro Ando
   – 3:23
   – 3:37
   – 3:23

Suzumiya Haruhi no Tsumeawase 

 was first released in Japan on June 21, 2006. In the actual performance, Susumu Nishikawa played the guitar, Takeshi Taneda played the bass guitar, and Yutaka Odawara played drums. Animators traced their performance by Rotoscoping, and drew the performance scene in animation.

 Oricon Weekly Rank Peak: #5 (Ties as highest charting release of the Haruhi Suzumiya franchise.)
 Weeks in Chart: 133 weeks (Longest charting release of the Haruhi Suzumiya franchise.)
 Sales: 136,000+ (highest selling)
 2006 End of Year Chart Rank: #106

Track listing
"God knows…" – 4:39
Vocals: Aya Hirano
Music: Satoru Kousaki
Arrangement: Satoru Kousaki
Lyrics: Aki Hata
"Lost my music" – 4:17
Vocals: Aya Hirano
Music: Satoru Kousaki
Arrangement: Satoru Kousaki
Lyrics: Aki Hata
  – 3:21
Vocals: Yuko Goto
Music: Satoru Kousaki
Arrangement: Satoru Kousaki
Lyrics: Yutaka Yamamoto

Saikyō Pare Parade

 is the second single by Aya Hirano, Minori Chihara and Yuko Goto, the first being Hare Hare Yukai. The songs "Saikyō Pare Parade" and "Unmeiteki Jiken no Kōfuku" were the opening and ending themes respectively for the Haruhi Suzumiya radio dramas. The single was released on November 22, 2006 by Lantis. A cover version and music video was produced by Momoiro Clover in 2009.

 Oricon Weekly Rank Peak: #9
 Weeks in Chart: 10 weeks

Track listing
 – 4:20
 – 4:33
 – 4:20
 – 4:33

Suzumiya Haruhi no Gensō

was a concert held in Tokyo on April 29, 2009 with music by the Tokyo Philharmonic Orchestra and Philip Chu as conductor. The event featured songs and background music from the anime arranged with a classical twist. A CD of the concert was released on June 24, 2009 and a DVD on February 26, 2010.

Track listing

"Lost my music"

"God knows..."

BGM & Radio Bangumi soundtracks

Volume 1

Asahina Mikuru's Adventure Episode 00 Soundtrack & Radio Bangumi 1 is the first such album containing background music tracks and radio segments from the anime version of The Melancholy of Haruhi Suzumiya, which was released on July 28, 2006 with the first DVD. The first track is the opening theme of Episode 00, the next nine tracks are BGM tracks from the anime composed by Satoru Kousaki unless otherwise specified, and the last six are audio drama segments performed by Aya Hirano, Minori Chihara, and Yuko Goto.

Track listing

Vocal: Yuko Goto
Composition: Satoru Kousaki

Composition: Satoru Kōsaki

Audio dramas

Radio dramas

Volume 1

 is the first volume radio drama CD released July 5, 2006.

 Oricon Weekly Rank Peak: #19
 Weeks in Chart: 4 weeks

Track listing
 – 2:55
 – 7:53
 – 7:12
 – 2:08
 – 7:02
 – 3:19
 – 11:03
 – 2:16
 – 5:44
 – 2:18

Volume 2

 is the second volume radio drama CD which was released on September 21, 2006.

 Oricon Weekly Rank Peak: #27
 Weeks in Chart: 4 weeks

Track listing
 – 4:18
 – 7:30
 – 6:05
 – 23:47
  – 5:58
 – 5:44
 – 3:54

Volume 3

 is the third volume radio drama CD in the series which was released on December 21, 2006.

 Oricon Weekly Rank Peak: #70 (Worst charting release of the whole Haruhi Suzumiya franchise.)
 Weeks in Chart: 3 weeks

Track listing
 – 6:55
 – 9:02
 – 9:59
 – 8:16
 – 3:29
 – 5:20
 – 4:28
 – 6:02
 – 5:49
 – 4:51
 – 3:54
 – 3:40

Drama CD

 is the title of the drama CD adapted from the Japanese anime series The Melancholy of Haruhi Suzumiya. It was released on January 24, 2007, published by Lantis. The last song on this CD, "First Good-Bye" is the drama CD's theme song sung by Aya Hirano.

 Oricon Weekly Rank Peak: #11
 Weeks in Chart: 5 weeks

Track listing
 – 1:36
 – 8:12
 – 8:34
 – 6:16
 – 11:10
 – 7:39
 – 5:50
 – 7:50
 – 6:34
"First Good-Bye" – 4:36

Voice actors
Aya Hirano as Haruhi Suzumiya (all) and all the main characters (track 8)
Minori Chihara as Yuki Nagato
Yuko Goto as Mikuru Asahina
Tomokazu Sugita as Kyon
Daisuke Ono as Itsuki Koizumi
Yuki Matsuoka as Tsuruya
Minoru Shiraishi as Taniguchi
Sayaka Aoki as Kyon's Sister

Character song singles

Nine music singles for The Melancholy of Haruhi Suzumiya have been released featuring songs sung by the voice actors of the characters in the anime. These include: the three main female and two main male characters in the series along with four other supporting female characters. The first three released included songs by Aya Hirano as Haruhi Suzumiya, Minori Chihara as Yuki Nagato and Yuko Goto as Mikuru Asahina. Moreover, two additional character CDs were released on December 6, 2006, sung by Yuki Matsuoka as Tsuruya and Natsuko Kuwatani as Ryoko Asakura. Two more character CDs were released on January 24, 2007, sung by Sayaka Aoki as Kyon's Sister and Yuri Shiratori as Emiri Kimidori.  Finally, the CDs for Itsuki Koizumi and Kyon were released on February 21, 2007.

Each of the nine albums feature the ending theme song "Hare Hare Yukai". Other than the three main female character's versions which are solo cover versions of the original, there are some alterations. For Tsuruya's version as well as Ryoko's version, the lyrics were changed to fit the character; Tsuruya's version contains her catchphrase "nyoro", while Ryoko reverses the optimistic lyrics to convey futility and destruction. However, while Tsuruya's and Ryoko's versions have the same arrangements as the original version, the last four released have their arrangements changed along with the lyrics. Kyon's Sister's version is very upbeat; Emiri's version is very fact-based; Itsuki's version talks about his ESP; and Kyon reflects about his now-disturbed life in his version.

References

Amazon.co.jp for Saikyo Pare Parade 
Amazon.co.jp for radio drama vol. 1 
Amazon.co.jp for radio drama vol. 2 
Amazon.co.jp for radio drama vol. 3 
Haruhi.tv for radio drama vol. 3

Notes

External links
  
 Suzumiya Haruhi no Yūutsu CD listing at Lantis' site 

Anime soundtracks
Film and television discographies
Albums
Discographies of Japanese artists
Lantis (company) albums
Lantis (company) soundtracks

ja:ハレ晴レユカイ